The Gum Nebula (Gum 12) is an emission nebula that extends across 36° in the southern constellations Vela and Puppis. It lies approximately 450 parsecs from the Earth. Hard to distinguish, it was widely believed to be the greatly expanded (and still expanding) remains of a supernova that took place about a million years ago. More recent research suggests it may be an evolved H II region. It contains the 11,000-year-old Vela Supernova Remnant, along with the Vela Pulsar.

The Gum Nebula contains about 32 cometary globules. These dense cloud cores are subject to such strong radiation from O-type stars γ2 Vel and ζ Pup and formerly the progenitor of the Vela Supernova Remnant that the cloud cores evaporate away from the hot stars into comet-like shapes. Like ordinary Bok globules, cometary globules are believed to be associated with star formation.

It is named after its discoverer, the Australian astronomer Colin Stanley Gum (1924–1960).  Gum had published his findings in 1955 in a work called A study of diffuse southern H-alpha nebulae (see Gum catalog).

The Gum nebula was photographed during Apollo 16 while the command module was in the double umbra of the Sun and Earth, using high-speed Kodak film.

Popular culture 
The Gum Nebula is explored by the crew of the Starship Titan in the Star Trek novel Orion's Hounds.

See also
 CG 4
 Barnard's Loop

References

External links

 
 APOD: Gum Nebula, with mouse over (2009.08.22)
 Galaxy Map: Entry for Gum 12 in the Gum Catalog 
 Galaxy Map: Detail chart for the Gould Belt (showing the location of Gum 12 relative to the sun)
 Encyclopedia of Science: Entry for the Gum Nebula (erroneously called Gum 56)
 SouthernSkyPhoto.com

 
Emission nebulae
Puppis
Vela (constellation)